Laurette Luez (born Loretta Mary Luiz; August 19, 1928 – September 12, 1999) was an American supporting actress and successful commercial model who appeared in films and on television during a 20-year career. She was a widely known Hollywood celebrity during the 1950s, owing much to publicity about her social life. She is best known for her supporting role as photographic model Marla Rakubian in Rudolph Maté's 1950 film noir D.O.A..

Early life
Luez was the second of three children born in Honolulu, Hawaii to Frank and Francesca Luiz (née Clancy), vaudeville singers and dancers who performed traditional Hawaiian and Spanish music. Luez's father was from Hawaii and had Portuguese ancestry. Her mother was Australian, the daughter of an actor. Luez first showed up on stage doing a hula dance at age three. That same year, six-year-old Loretta performed for Sultan Ibrahim of Johor, who was known as one of the wealthiest men in the world at that time.

Hollywood career

In 1944 she was cast as a fetching Javanese girl in The Story of Dr. Wassell. In October 1944, she was featured in Esquire. She signed a five-year contract with 20th Century-Fox in 1945, for a weekly salary of $125. In the late 1940s, she became a highly successful model, appearing in photographs and artwork for national brands such as Lux soap. In 1949, when she was 21, she played Marla Rakubian in the film noir D.O.A. In 1950, Luez became widely known for supporting roles with Roddy McDowell in Killer Shark, and Kim with Errol Flynn, which was the first major motion picture filmed in India. 

About working with Flynn, Luez said

Errol and I play our love scenes through the window and do not kiss. But we took stills embracing each other. They asked me if I enjoyed working that way with Errol and I told them it was very, very disturbing, to say the least.

In 1949, she participated in a later famous Life magazine photo layout, in which she posed with other up-and-coming actresses, Marilyn Monroe, Lois Maxwell, Cathy Downs, Suzanne Dalbert, Enrica Soma and Jane Nigh.

From that time forward she was cast mostly in exotic, sexy character roles in films and television. In 1953, she appeared in Siren of Bagdad as a dancing slave girl. The following year, she played a small role in the Bowery Boys film, Jungle Gents, opposite Huntz Hall's character "Sach" (her one line was "Kiss, kiss, kiss").

In 1956, she appeared in another exotic slave-girl role as Karamaneh in the syndicated TV series, The Adventures of Dr. Fu Manchu. She also was a regular on The Donald O'Connor Show (1954–1955).

Her last major film credit was in 1963 when she played a cantina girl, Felina, in Ballad of a Gunfighter with Marty Robbins, drawn from his 1959 hit song "El Paso." Luez left the film industry in 1965.

Marriages
 Actor Philip Sudano (August 16, 1947, Los Angeles, California; divorced 1948), with whom she had her first son, Alexander Eden.
 Greek director Gregg Tallas (1950, Las Vegas, Nevada; the marriage lasted three months); at the time Tallas said he hoped to open a production company in Greece featuring Luez as his star.
 Real estate investor Edward A. Harrison (1951, "secretly" in Tijuana, Mexico; annulled 1952). Luez claimed Harrison had not divorced his former wife and also said he threatened both her life and film career.
 Robert Creel (1956; divorced 1983), with whom she had two children, a son, Craig T. (born September 14, 1962, Los Angeles) and a daughter, Claudette M. (born May 1, 1968, Los Angeles).

Last years
By 1990 Luez was living in the Los Feliz district of Los Angeles with her sister Lei, along with a nephew. Laurette Luez died on September 12, 1999, in Milton, Florida, aged 71, from undisclosed causes.

Filmography

References

External links 
 

1928 births
1999 deaths
Actresses from Honolulu
American female models
American film actresses
American people of Portuguese descent
American people of Australian descent
People from Greater Los Angeles
20th-century American actresses
People from Los Feliz, Los Angeles